Joaquim Marques Lisboa, Marquis of Tamandaré (Rio Grande, December 13, 1807 – Rio de Janeiro, March 20, 1897) was a Brazilian admiral of the Imperial Navy of Brazil. He dedicated his life to the Brazilian Navy, including a life-long membership in Brazil's Military and Justice Council, then Supreme Military Court, from its inception until 1891, when the Republican Government granted him leave. 

A national military hero, he stands as the patron of Brazil's Navy, one of whose mottoes goes: "We belong to the undefeated Armada of Tamandaré". His birthday, December 13, was chosen by one of Brazil's foremost navy's minister in the early twentieth century, Admiral Alexandrino de Alencar, as the country's national Sailor's Day, on 4 September, 1925. 

As a young leftenant, Tamandaré took part in Brazilian War of Independence, in the repression of the Confederation of the Equator, and in the Cisplatine War (also known as the "Argentine-Brazilian War" of 1825-8, or else, according to Argentinean and Uruguayan historiography, the "Brazil War"). Furthermore, Tamandaré also saw action during the Regency turmoil, when the Empire faced constant and nearly ubiquitous instability, but managed to put down regional insurrections such as those Tamandaré participated in: the Cabanagem, in Pará (1835-8); the Sabinada, in Bahia but mostly its capital, Salvador (1837-9); in the Ragamuffin War, in Rio Grande do Sul (1835-1845); the Balaiada, in Maranhão, in which he took charge of all naval operations on his way up in his career as a naval officer (1838-1839); and the Praieira, in Pernambuco (1848-9). 

On the international-regional scene, he participated in the Platine War (1851-2) against Argentina's Juan Manuel de Rosas — arguably, the single major threat to Brazil at the time —, and in the Paraguayan War as the commander of all naval operations, leading an alliance between Brazil, Uruguay, and Argentina, by means of a treaty signed on 1 May, 1865. 

In the Río de la Plata basin, he was ahead of naval operations in the battles of Passo da Pátria (when Allied forces entered Paraguayan territory), Curuzú (one of the Allies most important victories up to that point), and at the allied defeat at Curupayti, for which he blamed Argentina's Bartolomé Mitre, personal in charge of the allied land forces at the battle, after which both Tamandaré and his Chief of Staff Francisco Barroso (who commanded the decisive Allied victory at Riachuelo by personally ramming enemy vessels with his own ship, which was nonetheless not designed for this purpose), two of the greatest military heroes in Brazil at the time, stepped outside of the conflict and did not return to Paraguay, which would be dragged into yet another four years of conflict until Solano López was captured and executed in the Battle of Cerro Corá and Paraguay surrendered. 

Tamandaré's memory still raises passions among the Navy's military nowadays, and he is studied by military and civilian scholars alike.

Biography 
Joaquim Marques Lisboa was son of Portuguese Francisco Marques Lisboa (born in Vila de Famalicão, Province of Minho, 1767) and Eufrásia Joaquina de Azevedo Lima (born in Viamão, Rio Grande do Sul). Tenth son of the couple's numerous offspring, among his brethren was Henrique Marques de Oliveira Lisboa, ranked Lieutenant Colonel who fought in the Ragamuffin War in Laguna, Rio Grande do Sul.

Francisco Marques Lisboa owned land properties in Rio Grande and in the current municipality of São José do Norte, which is separated from Rio Grande by a canal connecting Lagoa dos Patos to the Atlantic Ocean. Much has been discussed whether the future Admiral would have been born in Rio Grande or São José do Norte. The debate's projection grew in the national conjuncture, exacerbating the controversy, with both regions claiming to be the birthplace of Marques Lisboa. There is not the complete existence of a birth certificate, which makes believe that his hometown is Rio Grande. In December 1883, Tamandaré addressed the Rio Grande's city council, declaring the city as his birthplace

When he was five years old, he traveled to Rio de Janeiro, where he was taken care of by his sister, Maria Eufrásia, and her husband, José Antônio Lisboa, until the end of his primary course at the school of Professor Carvalho. By the age of 13, accompanied by his parents, Joaquim returned to his native land in the same boat he came to the court. In 1821, boarding alone one of his father's sailboats, he returned to the Court to progress his academic training. One year after, on November 22 and insisted by his father, Joaquim Lisboa accepted the honor of serving as volunteer in the squad detached to fight against Portuguese forces stationed in Bahia. Upon his father's request, on March 4, 1823, the young Joaquim began his fledgling career as a volunteer of the incipient Imperial Navy aboard frigate Niterói under the command of John Taylor, whose mast fluttered Admiral Cochrane's pavilion flag.

José Marques Lisboa, his brother and Ministry of Foreign Affairs' member was also his prosecutor. He sent Cochrane a petition requesting his attestment that Joaquim served voluntarily under his orders. In the same year, he submitted a suit to the Imperial Navy Academy's Director, certificating the time which he attended to academic studies in the Court, his conduct and helpfulness. In possession of these two certificates, José Marques Lisboa sent an application to the Emperor and Commander Taylor describing Joaquim's volunteering official confirmation. This document asked for his promotion to Commission's Second Lieutenant office. Thus, on December 2, 1825, Joaquim Marques Lisboa was promoted. The need for well-qualified Brazilian officers to garrison the fleets in Montevideo's waters gave him the chance and, on January 26, 1826, he was made a Second Lieutenant of the navy. At that conflict he led a daring action, the escape of 95 Brazilians who were captured after the battle of Carmen de Patagones. The young Marques Lisboa and Eyre managed to seize control of the Republic brig Ana carrying them to Salado and returned in triumph to Montevideo. 

He married his niece and childhood friend, who had almost his age, Maria Eufrásia. The marriage took place on February 19, 1839, at Our Lady of Glory Church (Igreja de Nossa Senhora da Glória) in Rio de Janeiro. After the Battle of Riachuelo, the number of arrived disenabled combatants at the capital was taking alarming proportions, thus arising the need to create an asylum, where they could be well treated. It was his wife, Viscountess of Tamandaré (Jovita Alves Feitosa) who, in spite of the situation perched by the country, took the initiative to organize auctions, as well as commerce auctions and many other social actions which helped her in this patriotic end. The first auction was a success, encouraging her to continue raising funds. An interesting fact is: a young woman from Piauí state enlisted in the Fatherland Volunteers Battalion, following the example of Maria Quitéria, who previously also wished to fight for her country. The viscountess Jovita Feitosa passed away in Rio de Janeiro.

Tamandaré, the origin of Lisboa's title, was a small village and an important support harbour on the Pernambuco coast. There his older brother Manoel Marques Lisbon, in 1824, took arms for the Confederation of the Equator against the nascent Empire. After repelling a first imperial invasion by the region on June 8, 1824, he died in the second attempt to take that land's control, which was more successful. During an Emperor's Dom Pedro II visit to the Pernambuco coast, thirty-five years later, Joaquim Lisboa asked him to stop by and transfer his brother Manuel's remains to the family's estate in Rio de Janeiro. Dom Pedro agreed and, sensitized by the gesture, gave him the honorary title of Baron in the later year. Differing over the name, Dom Pedro II remembered the Tamandaré village episode and its relation with Joaquim's brother memory and the place itself, which became crucial for choosing the Baron of Tamandaré as a name for the given title. This process is taken as a determinative point to explain these two historical figures' friendship.

In the course of his life, Brazil passed from Portugal's colonial possession to the United Kingdom of Portugal and Algarves, then the Brazilian Empire in 1822, and to 1889's Republican period. Tamandaré took a significant part in the country's formation, being an important reference to the next generations of sailors, military men and statesmen who owe the duty to preserve Brazil.

Campaigns 
In 1825, during the Cisplatine War - in which the United Provinces of the Río de la Plata sought to annex the Cisplatina Province, then belonging to the Empire of Brazil - Tamandaré, as lieutenant, excelled in many battles for leadership and courage. Captured with other Brazilians, at the battle of Carmen de Patagones, he snatched from the enemy the warship that took them prisoners, assuming its command at the age of 18. The young Joaquim Marques Lisboa, together with British officer William Eyre, at the head of 93 prisoners, led a daring escape. They managed to seize control of the Argentine ship Ana carrying them to Salado and returned to Montevideo despite the presence of escort ships.

He participated in the Platine War, in 1851, in the battle of the Tonelero Pass.

In 1864, already with the title of Baron of Tamandaré, he assumed the position of Commander in Chief of the Brazilian naval operations in the Río de la Plata.

During the Paraguayan War (1864–1870), Marques Lisboa was in command of the naval forces at the beginning of the conflict, between 1865 and 1866. He established a naval blockade and organized the logistic support for the forces in operation, which was fundamental for its success.

In the Naval Battle of Riachuelo (June 11, 1865), Francisco Manuel Barroso da Silva, appointed by him to command the divisions operating on the Paraná River, won the victory that changed the course of the war in favor of the Triple Alliance.

Marques Lisboa commanded the military operation in the battle of Paso de Patria in a successful landing of troops of great scope and thus, with the naval support in the conquest of the fortifications of the Paraguay River, secured the allied advance.

Career 

His career, taken by reference until this day, is considered excellent academic material to better understand nineteenth-century Brazil.

Throughout his military life, countless facts border the mythical scope. Nevertheless, many authors emphasize in addition to his heroic deeds that, in spite of his proximity to the Emperor D. Pedro II, he never gained political positions, a common fashion by that time, acting exclusively in military aspect - which is a curious fact because he fought for the Imperial State in all internal and external military interventions. His awakening into sailor life occurred after a solo trip to Rio de Janeiro aboard a ship from his father's company, when he performed the role of pilot, assisting the captain in seacraft. 

By the time politics were intense, that gave the young man the chance to enlist as volunteer and begin his journey in the National Navy which took him to the highest rank of the naval hierarchy. Political changes began in the Kingdom of Brazil with the return of King João VI to Portugal, leaving his son, Regent Prince D. Pedro, on Brazilian territory to rule for the Portuguese crown. However, displeased with decisions taken by the Lisbon's Cortes, Pedro decided to disobey them, which contributed to the political separation by the Brazilian Independence proclamation, who became crowned as its Constitutional Emperor and Perpetual Defender, awarding the title of Dom Pedro I. As a volunteer boarding Niterói, Tamandaré took part in several naval battles along the coast of provincial Bahia, where he had his baptism by fire on May 4, 1823, when the Brazilian fleet collided with enemy gunships. Days after, he pursued the fleeing Portuguese, capsizing seventeen enemy ships and draging the imperial flag until almost Tagus River entrance boarding the Niterói.

Returning from an important mission entrusted to Niterói, Marques Lisboa was enrolled in March 1824, at the Imperial Navy Academy. Meanwhile, domestic events required the squadron's presence in different parts of the country in order to impose the Central Government's authority. Badly remade from the Independence Wars, some ships went to Pernambuco to overthrow the revolution led by Manoel de Carvalho Pais de Andrade, whose objective was to bring together the various Northeastern Provinces to proclaim a Republic and constitute the Ecuador Confederation. As soon as came to his known that a Naval Division headed north to suppress the revolutionary initiative manifesting in various region's provinces countrywide, Marques Lisboa reported Admiral Cochrane to board one of the ships that would constitute the Division. 

Francisco Vilela Barbosa, then Minister of the Navy, refused and Cochrane, surpassing this topic request directly to the Emperor, presenting the young Joaquim. Using very consistent arguments, the Emperor had no choice but to give in and, on July 30, 1824, an Imperial Resolution arrived at the Academy, naming the volunteer Joaquim Marques Lisboa to board the fleet's flagship, Pedro I. Once the rebels were silenced, the fleet continued in the region erasing other possible revolutionary outbreaks. Joaquim carefully carried out all the missions assigned.

From 1825, already in the Cisplatina Campaign, the young Joaquim was embarked in Cannonira Leal Paulistana under the command of First Lieutenant Antonio Carlos Ferreira. The war began for Tamandaré on February 8, 1826, in what became known as the Combat of Corals. Later that same year he returned to the Niteroi under the command of James Norton, and was so prominent during the ensuing fighting that on July 31, 1826, he was assigned to command the Conga Schooner, appearing in his naval career as his first command. It is worth mentioning that he was only 18 years old on the date of his appointment. After an ill-fated invasion by land to the village of Carmem de Pantagones, in an attempt to control the entrance of the Rio Negro, returned the fight in the estuary of the Rio de la Plata, embarked in the frigate Prince Imperial, Captainship of the Naval Division in charge of the service of train of 18 merchant ships. 

He fell prisoner with 93 men. However, the Argentine enemy did not have the command and cunning of the young officer who, combined with his consort of Constance, planned and executed the taking of command of the prison ship Brigue Anna. The escort that accompanied them did not realize that the crew had fallen to the Brazilians until in a daring maneuver they set sail and fled to Montevideo. He had been promoted to First Lieutenant, on October 12, 1827, and at the age of twenty, he took command of Escela Bela Maria, with her engaging in intense artillery combat with an Argentine ship and winning, she demonstrated her humanitarian spirit with the enemy, which earned him the recognition of the vanquished (1828). After the end of the war, he spent another 2 years in the waters of the River Plate, and in 1831 he was sent back to Rio de Janeiro.

From the abdication of the Emperor D. Pedro I in 1831, he dedicated himself to fighting the revolting foci throughout the country, going from north to south. Still in 1831, combat in the northeast, in Pernambuco, Pará, Recife and Ceará. He was appointed to command the Brigue Cacique in 1834, which he commanded throughout his performance in the Ragamuffin War. In 1840 he was already Captain of Frigate and, in 1847, Captain of Sea and War. In 1848 he received in Great Britain the frigate Dom Afonso, the first mixed steam-sail ship of large size of the Brazilian Navy. Although the Prince of Joinville, Francisco Fernando de Orléans, the Dukes of Aumale and the Commander of the Fleet Admiral John Pascoe Grenfell, took to the rescue of the English ship, Ocean Monarch, that carried immigrants from Liverpool to Boston, who burned near the port, rescuing 156 people. On March 6, 1850, on his return from Pernambuco, where he had just fought the Praieira Revolt, on board the first mixed Brazilian steam and sailing vessel to Vasco da Gama Nau, which after a heavy storm in the Rio de Janeiro region lost its mast which left it to the tempest. Due to the complications of the moment, Joaquim Marques Lisboa could not approach Nau immediately, but would stay overnight all night, waiting for an opportunity to rescue the vessel, which he achieved at dawn the following day.

In 1852, he was promoted to the position of Head of Division, corresponding to Commodore in other navies and, in 1854, the Chief of Squadron, correspondent currently the Contra Admiral.

In 1857, during a stay in Europe to accompany the health treatment of his wife, was commissioned by the Imperial Government to supervise the construction of two gunboats in France and eight others in Great Britain. They were steam-powered mixed-propulsion ships, which meant a necessary upgrade for the Brazilian Navy to continue to fully defend the interests of the country. These ships acted in the War of Uruguay and in the War of Paraguay. In this issue, which evolved into a Brazilian military intervention, before the surrender of Montevideo, the Admiral led the fighting in Salto and Paissandu, occupying them with Brazilian troops. He commanded Brazilian intervention in the Eastern Republic of Uruguay in 1864 and 1865. The power struggle between the Blanco and Colorado parties led to a destabilization and civil war in the young country on the banks of the Prata. There were, however, 40,000 Brazilians living in the country, which made the internal problem a matter of interest to the Brazilian Empire. In addition to the internal political parties, they were involved in the power struggle, Paraguay and Argentina both supporting opposite sides and supported by their own interests. The place had become a barrel of gunpowder that exploded on August 10, 1864. The Baron of Tamandaré was appointed in 1864 for a diplomatic effort by Councilor Jose Antonio Saraiva to protect the interests of the Empire and the integrity of his subjects. On August 11, Counselor Saraiva left Montevideo with the failure of the negotiations, while Tamandaré and his Naval Force of the Rio de la Plata stayed to secure all the package demanded by the Emperor. Tamandaré's objective at the beginning of the conflict, as written by him in a letter dedicated to the Brazilian Minister of Foreign Affairs, was exclusively to obtain satisfaction from the Uruguayan Government for the injuries suffered by Brazilians, as well as to obtain guarantees for them and their property. With no intention of humiliating the sovereignty of that Republic or injuring its citizens. In any case, fearful of a thoughtless action could trigger a war in which the two bands of the Rio de la Plata would unite against Brazil, because he knew that they were not ready for such a confrontation. On August 30, relations were formally broken between Uruguay and Brazil. On September 7, the Imperial Government sent orders to the Baron of Tamandaré for three occupied Uruguayan towns, Paissandu, Salto and Cerro Largo, and for General Venancio Flores to be recognized as one of the belligerents. On October 11, it became the domain of the foreign diplomatic authorities residing in Montevideo that the Brazilian Imperial Government had determined the occupation of the Uruguayan territory to the north of the Rio Negro, in the form of reprisal, until they obtained guarantees and satisfactions from the government of the Uruguay. At all times his decisions were in accordance with the guidelines set out in the letter dated months ago, even though the conflict was already underway and diplomatic measures, in addition to failing, caused discontent in the Court. The situation of the Eastern Republic of Uruguay would generate by geopolitical aggravations what we know as the Paraguayan War, and Tamandaré's action in command of the Brazilian intervention was effective, acting with the necessary violence, in a timely manner and fulfilled its mission, using the means military personnel who were at his disposal.

His initial participation in the conflict was of extreme importance for the provision of Brazilian forces, especially in a relationship in which Brazil and Paraguay had great ignorance of their political actions and military forces, and he will do so through the Imperial Legion at Assumpção. However, the response of the Minister who was there highlighted contributed to a false appreciation of the forces and reserves of the enemy, and therefore the formulation of an extremely optimistic plan. Paraguay had just reformed its fortifications under the supervision of foreign officials of the highest caliber, reforms which permitted comparisons with the most notable fortifications of the known world, for example, Sevastopol, Gibraltar, and Richmond. Admiral Tamandaré took steps to protect the principal and first affected, sent letters to the President of the Province of Mato Grosso to alert him of the Paraguayan intentions to start the conflict and did the same with the Commander of the Flotilla that was located in the region in order to minimize the damage, however the responses he received were somewhat melancholic. The Commander of the Flotilla stated that his Force was tiny and possessed of little firepower to contain an invasion. Responsible for our forces in Rio de la Plata, it was one of his concerns to notify the Minister of the Navy about the need to form a veritable fleet of transports to ensure the mobility of the Imperial Army by the region. It is possible to realize that for Tamandaré the war was already a reality and that the time until the first shot was given, the first charge of cavalry was deflagrated and the first cannon roared should be dedicated to the preparation. The Imperial Government, even in the face of the Admiral's requests and warnings, decided nothing immediately, probably due to the complete ignorance of the enemy territory and its real state of mobilization. After the invasion of the Province of Corrientes by Solano López, Tamandaré sends a request to the Minister of the Navy on how he should proceed in the general campaign plan, and his response is the authorization to put into practice his ideas previously exposed to the Court. It ordered the blockade of the Paraguayan ports in the Paraná River, in order to suppress that Republic and to allow the support to the forces of the Army. Still thinking about mobility and supply, he bought tons of coal in the Province of Corrientes and elsewhere along the Paraná River. Predicting the aggravations of events during the conflict, he requested in all his communications for reinforcements; "Every lost day will matter to us in increasing expenses and sacrifices, to achieve the same result that could be obtained with energy and decision." The multiple and complex political and military problems that hampered the naval action of the Empire in the River Plate, demanded of Tamandaré an intense performance between Montevideo and Buenos Aires. The Brazilian neighbors at the time despite dislike the Solano López Government were not anxious to engage in a war in the region due to issues of internal dispute, in addition to that, a war-torn in the region would drastically affect the economy of these extremely connected and interdependent nations. Soon the Admiral would have to work to raise support for the Brazilian Empire as much as possible without putting pressure on these countries, as he could throw them against him. However, López's assault on the territories of the Province of Corrientes in Argentina, facilitated the conviction on the part of Tamandaré and the leaders of those Republics of the need to fight against Paraguay, but even this act of national outrage for the Argentine Republic did not support Brazil directly. In contrast, Flores in Uruguay insisted on reinforcing his support for any party that the Brazilian Empire took. Despite all political outlook on May 19, 1865, the Treaty of the Triple Alliance was signed, ensuring mutual cooperation between Uruguay, Argentina and Brazil for the duration of the conflict with the aggressor power, Paraguay. It belonged to Admiral Joaquim Marques Lisboa, Visconde de Tamandaré, then Marquês de Tamandaré, command of the Brazilian Naval Forces in War Operations against the Government of Paraguay. The Brazilian Navy represented practically all of the Naval Power present in the theater of operations. The General Command of the Allied Armies was exercised by the President of the Republic of Argentina, General Bartolomeu Miter. The Brazilian Naval Forces were not subordinate to it, in accordance with the Treaty of the Triple Alliance. The naval strategy adopted by the allies was the blockade. The Paraná River and Paraguay were the arteries of communication with Paraguay. The Brazilian Naval Forces were organized in three Divisions - one remained in the Rio de la Plata and the other two went up the Parana River to effect the blockade. On June 11, 1865, in the waters of the Paraná River, near the confluence of the Riachuelo, the bloody combat was called that received the name of the small affluent. The Brazilian Fleet, under the command of the Chief of Staff Francisco Manuel Barroso da Silva (later Barão do Amazonas), was valiantly beaten throughout the day against the ships of the Paraguayan Fleet, at the orders of Commander Mezza. Several of these were put to the bottom, getting a few seriously broken escape. In the course of the fight, in the Captaincy of Barroso - frigate Amazonas - numerous signs were raised transmitting orders to the other Brazilian commanders. Two of them were especially celebrated:

779- "Brazil expects each one to fulfill his duty"

10- "Hold up the fire that victory is ours"

In 1866, for health and political reasons, he asked for his removal from office, being replaced by Admiral Joaquim José Inácio, later Visconde de Inhaúma.

At the time of the Proclamation of the Republic of Brazil, on November 15, 1889, the Marquis of Tamandaré remained faithful to Pedro II of Brazil, remaining for about an hour alone with the Emperor, asking him permission for the Imperial Navy to a coup d'état, which was denied him. At the age of 82, and the last of the great royal monarchs of the past still alive (Duque de Caxias, Marquis of Herval, Admiral Barroso, Marshal Polidoro and all others had already died), he refused to accept the end of the Monarchy and remained hopeful of the possibility of a backlash. He remained with the imperial family until their definitive boarding on the ship Alagoas for exile.

He was reformed in 1890, according to decree of December 30, 1889, for having reached the age limit, being appointed Minister of the Supreme Military Court in 1893.

Nobility, medals and other prizes 

 For the high services rendered to the empire, he was awarded the titles of baron with greatness (14 March 1860), Viscount with greatness (18/02/1865), Conde (12/13/1887) and Marquês de Tamandaré (16 May 1888), being the first officer of the Armada to gain a title of nobility. D. Pedro II chose the name Tamandaré in honor of the beach in Pernambuco where he was in transit with the future Admiral, who asked the Emperor for the favor of collecting the remains of his brother Manoel Marques Lisboa, buried in the cemetery of that locality.
 By ministerial notice of 1957, the coat of arms or coat of arms of the Marquês de Tamandaré was approved.
 1841 - Officer of the Imperial Order of the Cruise; for services rendered in Maranhão, during the Cabanas revolution.
 1846 - Officer of the Imperial Order of the Rose; in his Decree dated November 14, 1846, the Emperor does not explain the reason for this concession, but says that "wishing to decorate and honor the Captain of the Fragata Joaquim Marques Lisboa, I should like to name him Officer of the said Order."
 1849 - Dignitary of the Imperial Order of the Cruise; for services rendered in defense of public order in Pernambuco, during the Praieira Revolution.
 1849 - Commander of the Military Order of the Tower and Sword; conferred by D. Maria II, as a testimony of the appreciation for their relevant services rendered on the occasion of the rescue of the Portuguese vessel Vasco da Gama, in front of Barra de Rio de Janeiro.
 Commander of the Imperial Order of the Cruise; Tamandaré gave the greatest affection to this Comenda, because he belonged to D. Pedro II. During a reception in Uruguaiana, Dom Pedro II received in a special audience the English Ambassador Thornton, to try to reestablish relations between Brazil and England, interrupted since the Christie Question. Realizing Tamandaré that the Commendation of the Emperor presented a small defect, he exchanged his with D. Pedro, who ended up permanently staying with her
 1859 - Commander of the Imperial Order of the Rose; for services rendered during the epidemic of cholera morbus that affected different Provinces of the Empire in the years 1855 and 1856.
 Great Cross of the Order of Francis Joseph of Austria; granted gracefully by said Emperor, was authorized to use it on November 26, 1860.
 1861 - Commander of the Order of St. Benedict of Aviz; in reward for its 35 years of good services rendered to the country.
 1865 - Gentleman of the Imperial Order of the Rose; for the relevant services rendered to the country, during the Uruguayan State Campaign.
 1867 - Great Cruz effective of the Imperial Order of the Rose; in attention to the good services rendered in the Naval Force in Operations of War against the Government of Paraguay.
 1868 - Grand Cross of the Order of Saint Benedict of Aviz, in reward for his 45 years of good service to the country.
 Necklace of the Imperial Order of the Rose; in view of the relevant services rendered to the country in the wars against Uruguay and the Government of Paraguay.
 Gold medal commemorating the taking of the city of Paissandu, with the help of naval forces under his command.
 Gold medal in commemoration of the surrender of Uruguaiana, to which it contributed effectively with its River Flotilla.
 Medal of Military Merit, of bronze with silver passer, bearing the number 3, granted to all the officers who obtained prizes by acts of bravery in the Campaign of Paraguay.
 General Medal of the Paraguayan Campaign, in gold, with the character of the Cross of Malta, in recognition of the services rendered to the Homeland in the Campaign of Paraguay, bringing in the passer the number of years spent in the campaign, counting nine months for a year.
 Commemorative Medal of War against the Government of Paraguay, granted by the Argentine Republic to all members of the Armada and Allied Armies.
 Medal Commemorative of the War against the Government of Paraguay, conferred by the Eastern Republic of Uruguay to all members of the Armada and Allied Armies, who took an effective part in said Campaign. (Medal awarded post-mortem)
 Oval Medal of the War of Independence; at the gala ceremonies, gave her special importance, always putting her in more evidence, hanging from her neck, displaying her pride of having contributed, on board the Niterói, to Brazil's freedom.
 Gold medal with lace of brilliant; offered by the Montevidean ladies.
 Gold medal; offered by the Liverpool Shipwreck Human Society, with dedication, in honor of the rescue of the passengers and crew of the Steam Ocean Monarch.
 Gold medal; offered by the Lord Mayor of Liverpool, with dedication, in honor of the rescue of the passengers and crew of the Steam Ocean Monarch.
 Gold chronometer; offered by the British Government, containing the following dedication: "Present of the British Government to Commander Joaquim Marques Lisboa, of the Fragata Afonso da Marinha Imperial Brasileira, in testimony of his admiration for the bravery and humanitarian manifestation to the rescue to many subjects of the fire of the ship Ocean Monarch, August 1848. "
 Sword of gold, carved with dedication; offered by the Portuguese Colony of Rio de Janeiro, in honor of the rescue of Nau Vasco da Gama.

Ships 
Over time the Navy of Brazil, in honor of its patron, named several ships with the name Tamandaré.

 Ironclad Tamandaré: Built in the Court's Navy Arsenal and incorporated into the Imperial Navy in 1865. It was one of the first ironclads built in Brazil. It played an important role operating in the Paraguay River, in the War of the Triple Alliance.
 Protected Cruiser Almirante Tamandaré: Mixed propulsion vessel, built in the Navy Arsenal of Rio de Janeiro, under the plan of the Naval Engineer João Cândido Brasil. It was incorporated into the Armada in 1891, with service drop in 1915. It was the largest warship ever built in Brazil, with a displacement of 4,500 tons.
 Light Cruiser Tamandaré: Built in the United States in 1938, it participated in World War II, incorporated into the Navy of that country with the name Saint Louis. Transferred to the Brazilian Navy based on the Mutual Assistance Law, he was incorporated into the Navy in 1951, and retired from active service in 1976.

UNESCO'S Memory of the World 
The Archive of the Navy has in its collection a cataloged collection of approximately 1500 documents of its correspondence, called "Tamandaré Archive", consisting of a fund of 1492 documents, divided into 17 books, being a rich source of historical material about the Patron of the Brazilian Navy. The collection began in 1949, when the Navy announced the purchase by the then Ministry of the Navy, along with Leon Victor Louis Robichez, widow of Luiza Marques Lisbon Robichez, granddaughter of the Marquês de Tamandaré, documents and objects; among them 153 offices of the Minister of the Navy of the War of Paraguay, the Stranding of Jequitinhonha, diplomas of promotions and appointments of Joaquim Marques Lisboa among other innumerable documents of incalculable value for the Navy and for the history of Brazil. These documents, very important for Brazilian historiography, were presented in 2010, the Board of Directors of the UNESCO Memory of the World Committee and nominated as the "Memory of the World-Brazil", and became part of a Registry of the Documentary Heritage, similar to the one existing for places considered as of universal value, included in the list of World Heritage of Humanity, UNESCO.

References

Brazilian military personnel of the Paraguayan War
Brazilian admirals
Brazilian monarchists
1897 deaths
Brazilian nobility
1807 births
People from Rio Grande (Rio Grande do Sul)
19th-century Brazilian military personnel
People of the Cisplatine War